Vice Admiral Robin Paul Boissier,  (born 14 October 1953) is a former Royal Navy officer who served as Chief of Fleet Support from 2004 to 2006.

Personal life
Boissier is the only son of Peter Clement Boissier, formerly of the Royal Naval Volunteer Reserve, and his wife Joan Rosemary ( Yeomans),

Boissier is married to Susie.

Naval career
Boissier joined the Royal Navy in 1974. He was appointed Deputy Commander, Strike Force South in 2003, Director-General Logistics (Fleet) and Chief of Fleet Support in 2004, and Deputy Commander-in-Chief Fleet and Chief Naval Warfare Officer in 2006. He retired in 2009.

Later life
In retirement Boissier became Chief Executive of the Royal National Lifeboat Institution. Vice Admiral Boissier retired from the RNLI in May 2019 and was succeeded by Mark Dowie.

References

|-

1953 births
Living people
Royal Navy vice admirals
Companions of the Order of the Bath
Royal National Lifeboat Institution people